The following lists events that happened during 1977 in Australia.

Incumbents

Monarch – Elizabeth II
Governor-General – Sir John Kerr (until 8 December), then Sir Zelman Cowen
Prime Minister –  Malcolm Fraser
Deputy Prime Minister – Doug Anthony
Opposition Leader – Gough Whitlam (until 22 December), then Bill Hayden
Chief Justice – Sir Garfield Barwick

State and Territory Leaders
Premier of New South Wales – Neville Wran
Opposition Leader – Sir Eric Willis (until 16 December), then Peter Coleman
Premier of Queensland – Joh Bjelke-Petersen
Opposition Leader – Tom Burns
Premier of South Australia – Don Dunstan
Opposition Leader – David Tonkin
Premier of Tasmania – Bill Neilson (until 1 December), then Doug Lowe
Opposition Leader – Max Bingham
Premier of Victoria – Rupert Hamer
Opposition Leader – Clyde Holding (until 29 June), then Frank Wilkes
Premier of Western Australia – Sir Charles Court
Opposition Leader – Colin Jamieson
Majority Leader of the Northern Territory – Goff Letts (until 12 August), then Paul Everingham
Opposition Leader – Jon Isaacs (from 21 September)

Governors and Administrators
Governor of New South Wales – Sir Roden Cutler
Governor of Queensland – Sir Colin Hannah (until 20 March), then Sir James Ramsay (from 22 April)
Governor of South Australia – Sir Douglas Nicholls (until 30 April), then Sir Keith Seaman (from 1 September)
Governor of Tasmania – Sir Stanley Burbury
Governor of Victoria – Sir Henry Winneke
Governor of Western Australia – Sir Wallace Kyle
Administrator of Norfolk Island – Desmond O'Leary

Events

January
5 January – Australia's only aircraft suicide attack carried out by a disgruntled former employee of Connellan Airways takes place. The Connellan air disaster claims the life of 6 people including the pilot.
10 January – The Easey Street murders take place, an unsolved crime in which two women were brutally stabbed to death in their home in the inner-Melbourne suburb of Collingwood.
18 January – Australia experiences its worst railway disaster at Granville, near Sydney, in which 83 people died.

February
1 February – The Federal Court of Australia began to exercise its jurisdiction.
6 February – Silver Jubilee of Elizabeth II's accession as Queen of Australia
7 February - 418 refugees of the Vietnam war arrived in Melbourne.  The refugees, from Vietnam, Cambodia and Laos, left refugee camps around Bangkok for the largest airlift of war victims from Thailand.
28 February - ABBA arrive in Australia for their Live concert tour around the country starting at the Sydney Showgrounds.

March
8 March - The Federal Government held a reception for Queen Elizabeth II.
9 March - Queen Elizabeth II arrived in Brisbane as part of her Silver Jubilee goodwill tour.
13 March - ABBA In Australia tour concludes. 
15 March - The former Australian consul to Timor, Mr Jim Dunn, prepared to testify to the United States Congress on Indonesian atrocities.  The Indonesian Foreign Minister, Mr Adam Malik, responded by threatening that his Government would allow "demonstrations and other mass actions" against the Australian Embassy to continue if further agitation against alleged Indonesian atrocities were allowed.
The Foreign Minister, Andrew Peacock, presented a 24-page speech to Federal Parliament in which he outlined a new direction in foreign policies based on Australia's richness in a world of want.  He said population and resources would be central future policies, as well as making attacks on Soviet Union military expansion.
Federal Cabinet approved an agreement with the United States for the construction of the controversial Omega navigation station at a predicted cost of $15 million.
31 March - The Conciliation and Arbitration Commission’s wage decision was handed down.  The Commission indicated that it would hold an inquiry into various aspects of wage fixation.  The Commission introduced a $5.70 a week increase on prices, prompting the Treasurer, Mr Lynch to say that the decision would retard the fight against inflation.

April
13 April - The Premiers Conference was held.  All governments committed to a three-month Prices and Wages Freeze.

May
15 May – A new political party, the Australian Democrats is launched by former Liberal MP Don Chipp at Melbourne Town Hall.
21 May – A referendum is held. Questions on Senate casual vacancies, referendums and retirement of judges are passed. A question on simultaneous elections for the House of Representatives and the Senate fails. A plebiscite to decide Australia's national song is won by "Advance Australia Fair".
24 May - President Jimmy Carter gave the Australian Government his personal assurance that US agencies (in particular the Central Intelligence Agency) were not engaged in improper activities in Australia, an issue that had resurfaced in the espionage trial of Christopher Boyce in the United States. Fraser included this information in a statement to the House of Representatives on 24 May.
John Howard tabled a White Paper on the future of the manufacturing industry.  The paper noted that despite the growth of mining, manufacturing still employed more than 1.3 million people in 1975, of whom 0.5 million had been born overseas. Manufacturing depended substantially on tariff protection and other government assistance, as well as facing ever-increasing competition from other countries, particularly in Asia.

June
15 June - The Gleneagles Agreement is unanimously approved by the Commonwealth of Nations at a meeting at Gleneagles, Auchterarder, Scotland. Commonwealth Presidents and Prime Ministers agree, as part of their support for the international campaign against apartheid, to discourage contact and competition between their sportsmen and sporting organisations, teams or individuals from South Africa.
22 June - The Uniting Church in Australia is formed following the union of the majority of Presbyterian, Methodist and Congregational Union churches in Australia.
Prime Minister Malcolm Fraser met President Jimmy Carter.  Fraser was impressed by Carter 'as a decisive man' who would be 'setting American objectives in the great humanitarian issues'. Carter undertook to consult Australia before any agreement was concluded with the Soviet Union on arms limitation in the Indian Ocean.

July
1 July – The Office of the Commonwealth Ombudsman is established.
15 July – Anti-drugs campaigner Donald Mackay disappears near Griffith, New South Wales. He is presumed to have been murdered.

August
7 August - At the Association of South-East Asian Nations meeting in Kuala Lumpur, The Prime Minister, Malcolm Fraser, offered ASEAN leaders a package of increased bilateral aid of $250 million, as well as an extra $10 million for joint development projects, but claimed Australia could do nothing in its present economic circumstances to reduce trade barriers against their countries' products.
9 August - A board of inquiry into Housing Commission land deals is appointed by the Victorian Government with the power to investigate Cabinet decisions and to call Ministers to give evidence.  
11 August - A 24-hour strike by postal staff at Melbourne's two biggest parcel centres stops more than 25,000 parcels being handled.
15 August - Cabinet decided that Australia would negotiate bilateral safeguards agreements with purchasers covering both present and future use of the uranium. Australia would seek an understanding with other exporters on the application and enforcement of safeguards, but this would not constitute a commercial cartel to control price or quantity.
16 August - Federal Treasurer Philip Lynch presents the 1977–78 budget, with a predicted deficit of $2.21 billion. It reduced personal income tax scales from seven to three (32 per cent, 46 per cent and 60 per cent) and also provided personal tax cuts to operate from 1 February 1978. 
17 August - The Federal Treasurer, Phillip Lynch, addresses the National Press Club of Australia and blames the Arbitration Commission for the lack of improvement in unemployment for its failure to restrain wages through its decisions.
21 August - Mail services returns to normal following the end of a national postal dispute.
23 August - Cabinet makes its final decisions on uranium, endorsing the main findings of the Fox inquiry unless there were 'compelling reasons' for departing from them. It was agreed that mining could proceed, subject to environmental controls and a stringent nuclear safeguards regime. The Ranger mine could be developed without further environmental assessment, but the other two mines in the Alligator River region – Jabiluka and Koongarra – would not be approved for a considerable time. Cabinet also agreed on the staged establishment of Kakadu National Park, although the Ranger, Jabiluka and Koongarra uranium leases were to be excluded from it.
24 August – Australia's first 7-Eleven convenience store opens in the Melbourne suburb of Oakleigh.

September
4 September – The Queensland government bans street marches and demonstrations.
6 September - 
Victoria experiences a statewide 24-hour stoppage of train, tram and tramway bus services due to a strike by 20,000 public transport workers - the third strike in a month.
The Federal Attorney-General, Mr Ellicott, quits the Fraser Ministry after a row with Cabinet over the conspiracy case against former Labor Ministers.  Senator Durack is appointed in his place.
15 September - The ACTU congress resolved to ban the mining and export of uranium from mid-November unless the Government agreed to hold a referendum on the issue. The referendum proposal was not favoured by the Australian Labor Party, most of whose Parliamentary leaders were inclined to support mining.
The Indian military attaché in Canberra and his wife were attacked by a member of the Indian Ananda Marga sect.
17 September – A state election is held in South Australia. The incumbent Australian Labor Party led by Don Dunstan is returned to power.

October
8 October – The Tasman Bridge in Hobart re-opens after repair to the damage sustained in the Tasman Bridge disaster when the bridge was struck by the bulk ore carrier MV Lake Illawarra on 5 January 1975.
19 October - An employee of Air India’s Melbourne office is stabbed by a man who left a threatening letter, allegedly from the Ananda Marga-affiliated Universal Proutist Revolutionary Federation. Cabinet decides to review the management of explosives by Commonwealth agencies and to provide 203 more Commonwealth police for diplomatic security work, while foreign missions in Australia are urged to upgrade their security.
27 October - Prime Minister Malcolm Fraser announces that the election will be held on 10 December.

November
12 November – A state election is held in Queensland, with the Liberal Party of Australia-National coalition led by Joh Bjelke-Petersen gaining their fourth successive victory.
18 November - Phillip Lynch resigns as Federal Treasurer
30 November – The High Court of Australia rules in the case of Cridland v Federal Commissioner of Taxation that a group of university students avoiding tax by claiming to be farmers were acting legally under provisions of the Income Tax Assessment Act 1936.

December
1 December – Bill Neilson resigns as Premier of Tasmania, and is replaced by Doug Lowe.
8 December - Sir Zelman Cowen replaced Sir John Kerr as Governor-General of Australia.
10 December – 1977 Australian federal election: Malcolm Fraser's Liberal/National Country Coalition Government is re-elected with a slightly reduced majority, defeating the Labor Party led by former Prime Minister Gough Whitlam. 
22 December - Bill Hayden and Lionel Bowen replaced Whitlam and Uren in the ALP leadership.

Science and technology

Arts and literature
 Kevin Connor wins the Archibald Prize with Robert Klippel
 Ruth Park's novel Swords and Crowns and Rings wins the Miles Franklin Award

Film
 The Getting of Wisdom

Television
3 April - When Countdown celebrated 100 episodes, Ian "Molly" Meldrum felt tired and emotional. Regulars Daryl Braithwaite & John Paul Young both fill in for Meldrum for the last remainder of the show.
 Popular soap operas Bellbird, Number 96, and The Box, are all cancelled.
 Television soap operas The Restless Years and Cop Shop begin.
 November - On Countdown, Ian "Molly" Meldrum interviews His Royal Highness Prince Charles.

Sport
 12 March – The Centenary Test commences between England and Australia at the Melbourne Cricket Ground
 20 March – Australia is represented by nine long-distance runners (all men), including Robert de Castella, at the fifth IAAF World Cross Country Championships in Düsseldorf, West Germany. Steve Austin is Australia's best finisher, claiming the 15th spot (38:26.0) in the race over 12,3 kilometres.
 2 April – The National Soccer League kicks off, as the first league of any football code to become national. The opening game sees West Adelaide defeat Canberra City 3–1 at Manuka Oval in Canberra.
 7 May - Hawthorn set two VFL records when they kick 41 behinds and have a total of 66 scoring shots against St Kilda. These totals remain six ahead of the second-most behinds and scoring shots.
 6 August – Robert Wallace wins the men's national marathon title, clocking 2:20:11.2 in Cressy, Tasmania.
 England defeat a weakened Australia team 3–0 in The Ashes test series
 17 September - St. George and minor premiers Parramatta play a 9–9 draw after 100 minutes in the NSWRL Grand Final. It is the first Grand Final to be tied after 100 minutes including extra time. Newtown finish in last position, claiming their second straight wooden spoon.
 24 September
 St. George thrash Parramatta 22–0 in the Grand Final replay
North Melbourne and Collingwood play only the second VFL Grand Final draw in history.
 1 October - North Melbourne defeat Collingwood in the Grand Final replay
 2 October – In motor racing Ford team-mates Allan Moffat and Colin Bond finish side by side to complete a 1–2 Formation Finish at the Bathurst 1000.
 Gold and Black wins the Melbourne Cup
 Western Australia wins the Sheffield Shield
 Kialoa II wins the Sydney to Hobart Yacht Race

Births
 1 January – Craig Reucassel, comedian and television host
 2 January – Jai Rowell, politician
 6 January – Shane Rigon, rugby league player
 17 January – Leigh Whannell, actor, filmmaker
 8 February – Barry Hall, footballer
 14 February – Cadel Evans, cyclist
 14 February- Jim Jefferies, comedian 
 21 February – Ben Ikin, rugby league player
 24 February – Jason Akermanis, Australian Rules footballer
 25 February – Joanne Banning, field hockey striker
 1 March – Fiona Scott, politician
 15 March – Adrian Burnside, baseball player
 24 March – Darren Lockyer, Rugby league footballer
 31 March – Garth Tander, racing driver
 12 April – Sarah Monahan, actress
 6 May – Chantelle Newbery, Olympic champion diver
 10 May – Chas Licciardello, comedian
 14 May – Ada Nicodemou, actress
 24 May – Katie Noonan, new age musician/soprano (george)
 7 June – Preston Campbell, rugby league player
 11 June – Geoff Ogilvy, golfer
 20 June – Aaron Moule, rugby league player
 6 July – Con Blatsis, Australian footballer
 10 July – Schapelle Corby, drug trafficker
 12 July – Soa Palelei, mixed martial artist
 26 July – Rebecca St. James, Australian-born Christian musician
 6 August – Rebecca Maddern, journalist and television host
 11 August – Byron Pickett, Australian Rules footballer
 13 August – Michael Klim, swimmer
 14 August – Justin Anlezark, shot putter
 15 August – Anthony Rocca, Australian Rules footballer
 25 August – Lawrence Leung, comedian, writer, and director 
 31 August – Craig Nicholls, rock musician and songwriter
 1 September – Henry Collins, boxer
 6 September – Peter Wakefield, boxer
 23 October – Brad Haddin, cricketer
 30 October – Charmian Faulkner, missing toddler
 11 November – Ben Hollioake, Australian-born England cricketer (d. 2002)
 16 November – Gigi Edgley, actress
 6 December – Peta Gallagher, field hockey striker
 30 December 
 Grant Balfour, Major League Baseball pitcher
 Scott Lucas, Australian rules footballer

Deaths
 14 January – Peter Finch (born 1916), actor
 18 April – Ernest Henry Woollacott (born 1888), minister, social welfare analyst and temperance advocate
 23 April – John McDonald (born 1898), Premier of Victoria (1950–1952)
 22 August – Rex Connor (born 1907), ALP politician

See also
 1977 in Australian television
 List of Australian films of 1977

References

 
Australia
Years of the 20th century in Australia